Beast Rest Forth Mouth is the second studio album by Brooklyn-based indie rock band Bear in Heaven, released October 13, 2009 on their own Hometapes label. Its name is a play on the four cardinal directions (East, West, North, South). It was well received by the Pitchfork upon its release, earning a score of 8.4 out of 10, as well as being featured in Pitchfork's "Best New Music".

Track listing

Personnel 

 Jon Philpot – vocals, guitar and keyboards
 Adam Wills – guitar and bass
 Sadek Bazarra – keyboards, bass
 Joe Stickney – drums
 Artwork: Laura Brothers

References 

2009 albums
Bear in Heaven albums